Anastasia Suslova (born 11 October 1996) is a Russian handball player who plays for Zvezda Zvenigorod and the Russian national team.

International honours  
EHF Champions League:
Fourth place: 2015

References
 

1996 births
Living people
Sportspeople from Volgograd
Russian female handball players
Handball players at the 2014 Summer Youth Olympics